Jonas Gray (born June 27, 1990) is a former American football running back. He played college football at Notre Dame. He was signed by the Miami Dolphins as an undrafted free agent in 2012 and also played for the Baltimore Ravens and New England Patriots. Gray is best known for his performance with the Patriots in a 2014 game against the Indianapolis Colts.

Early years
From Pontiac, Michigan, Gray went to high school at Detroit Country Day. He helped lead Detroit Country Day to an 11–3 record as a senior and an appearance in the state championship. He rushed for 305 yards on 29 carries and scored four touchdowns in the state semifinal to lead the Yellow Jackets to a 37–30 victory. He gained 2,614 yards on 341 rushes (7.7 avg.) and scored 32 TDs during his senior season, rushing for over 200 yards in five games. He was selected to play in the U.S. Army All-American Bowl in San Antonio, Texas. Gray also competed in track & field at Detroit County. In 2006, he placed fourth in the 200-meter dash at the MHSAA Division 3 State Finals with a time of 22.84 seconds, and as a senior, placed third in the 100-meter dash with a time of 11.13 seconds.

Considered a four-star recruit by Rivals.com, he was rated as the fourth best running back prospect of his class.

College career
Gray attended the University of Notre Dame from 2008 to 2011. He played sparingly his first three seasons, primarily as a back-up to Armando Allen, Robert Hughes and Cierre Wood. As a senior, while splitting carries with Wood, Gray rushed for 791 yards on 114 carries (6.9 avg) while scoring 12 touchdowns. He tore his ACL, MCL, and LCL during a game vs. Boston College.

Professional career

Miami Dolphins
Gray was signed by the Miami Dolphins as an undrafted free agent. He was placed on the PUP list while he rehabbed his injured knee. He was among final cuts on August 31, 2013.

Baltimore Ravens
Gray was signed by the Baltimore Ravens to their practice squad on September 2, 2013.

New England Patriots
Gray was signed by the New England Patriots to a future/reserve contract on January 10, 2014. Gray did not survive the final cuts, but was signed to the practice squad the next day. On October 16, 2014 Gray was signed to the active roster before their Thursday Night Football game against the New York Jets.

On November 16, 2014, Gray rushed for 201 yards, and a franchise-record four touchdowns on 37 carries in his fourth NFL game, leading the New England Patriots to a 42–20 victory over the host Indianapolis Colts. Gray was the first NFL running back since 1921 to score four rushing touchdowns in a game after entering the game with zero career touchdowns, and the first running back in the Super Bowl era to account for more than 25 percent of rushing touchdowns (4 of 10) in a week with at least 10 games. A correction to the official stats (removing a 2-yard loss that was negated by a 15-yard facemask penalty against the Colts) made his final stats for the game 201 yards on 37 carries. He scored 24 total points in the game, which was tied with Marshawn Lynch for the most by any player in a single game in the 2014 season.

Due to a team infraction, however, Gray was benched for the next game. He would only record 91 more total yards in the season, and was inactive for four of the Patriots remaining nine games, including the team's win in Super Bowl XLIX. Gray finished the season with 89 carries that resulted in 412 total yards and 5 touchdowns. On September 5, 2015, Gray was released by the Patriots.

Miami Dolphins (second stint)
The Dolphins signed Gray to their practice squad on September 9, 2015. On September 11, Gray signed to Dolphins active roster. On September 14, 2015, Gray was waived by the Dolphins, only to be re-added to the practice squad two days later and signed to the active squad on September 22, 2015.  He was released again on November 10, 2015, and re-signed to the practice squad the next day.

Jacksonville Jaguars
Gray was signed off the Dolphins' practice squad to the Jacksonville Jaguars active roster on December 15, 2015. On August 17, 2016, Gray was waived/injured by the Jaguars. After going unclaimed on waivers, Gray reverted to injured reserve. On August 24, 2016, Gray was released from the Jaguars' injured reserve.

References

External links
Notre Dame Fighting Irish bio

1990 births
Notre Dame Fighting Irish football players
Living people
Detroit Country Day School alumni
Players of American football from Michigan
Sportspeople from Pontiac, Michigan
Baltimore Ravens players
New England Patriots players
Miami Dolphins players
Jacksonville Jaguars players
American football running backs